The Mali War is an ongoing armed conflict that started in January 2012 between the northern and southern parts of Mali in Africa. On 16 January 2012, several insurgent groups began fighting a campaign against the Malian government for independence or greater autonomy for northern Mali, which they called Azawad. The National Movement for the Liberation of Azawad (MNLA), an organization fighting to make this area of Mali an independent homeland for the Tuareg people, had taken control of the region by April 2012.

On 22 March 2012, President Amadou Toumani Touré was ousted in a coup d'état over his handling of the crisis, a month before a presidential election was to have taken place. Mutinous soldiers, calling themselves the National Committee for the Restoration of Democracy and State (CNRDR), took control and suspended the constitution of Mali. As a consequence of the instability following the coup, Mali's three largest northern cities—Kidal, Gao and Timbuktu—were overrun by the rebels on three consecutive days. On 5 April 2012, after the capture of Douentza, the MNLA said that it had accomplished its goals and called off its offensive. The following day, it proclaimed the independence of northern Mali from the rest of the country, renaming it Azawad.

The MNLA were initially backed by the Islamist group Ansar Dine. After the Malian military was driven from northern Mali, Ansar Dine and a number of smaller Islamist groups began imposing strict Sharia law. The MNLA and Islamists struggled to reconcile their conflicting visions for an intended new state. Afterwards, the MNLA began fighting against Ansar Dine and other Islamist groups, including Movement for Oneness and Jihad in West Africa (MOJWA/MUJAO), a splinter group of Al-Qaeda in the Islamic Maghreb. By 17 July 2012, the MNLA had lost control of most of northern Mali's cities to the Islamists.

The government of Mali asked for foreign military help to re-take the north. On 11 January 2013, the French military began operations against the Islamists. Forces from other African Union states were deployed shortly after. By 8 February, the Islamist-held territory had been re-taken by the Malian military, with help from the international coalition. Tuareg separatists have continued to fight the Islamists as well, although the MNLA has also been accused of carrying out attacks against the Malian military.

A peace deal between the government and Tuareg rebels was signed on 18 June 2013, however on 26 September 2013 the rebels pulled out of the peace agreement and claimed that the government had not respected its commitments to the truce. In mid-2014, the French military in Mali ended its Operation Serval and transitioned to the broader regional counterterrorist effort, Operation Barkhane. Despite a ceasefire agreement signed on 19 February 2015 in Algiers, Algeria, and a peace accord in the capital on 15 April 2015, fighting continued.

Starting in 2018, there was an increase in rebel attacks in the Sahel, accompanied by a French troop surge. Mali experienced two successful coups in 2020 and 2021, both orchestrated by the Malian military. After the Malian coup in 2021, the government and French forces in the country had a falling out, with the former demanding the latter's withdrawal. Amid popular Malian anti-French protests and increasing involvement in the war by the Russian mercenary Wagner Group, the French withdrew their forces from the country entirely by August 15, 2022, ending their presence in the country.

Background

In the early 1990s Tuareg and Arab nomads formed the People's Movement for the Liberation of Azawad (MPA) and declared war for independence of the northern part of Mali. Despite peace agreements with the government of Mali in 1991 and 1995 a growing dissatisfaction among the former Tuareg fighters, who had been integrated into the Military of Mali, led to new fighting in 2007. Despite historically having difficulty maintaining alliances between secular and Islamist factions the National Movement for the Liberation of Azawad allied itself with the Islamist groups Ansar Dine and Al-Qaeda in the Islamic Maghreb and began the 2012 Northern Mali conflict.

The MNLA was an offshoot of a political movement known as the National Movement for Azawad (MNA) prior to the insurgency. After the end of the Libyan Civil War, an influx of weaponry led to the arming of the Tuareg in their demand for independence. The strength of this uprising and the use of heavy weapons, which were not present in the previous conflicts, were said to have "surprised" Malian officials and observers.

Though dominated by Tuaregs, the MNLA claimed that they represented other ethnic groups as well, and were reportedly joined by some Arab leaders. The MNLA's leader Bilal Ag Acherif said that the onus was on Mali to either give the Saharan peoples their self-determination or they would take it themselves.

Another Tuareg-dominated group, the Islamist Ansar Dine (Defenders of Faith), initially fought alongside the MNLA against the government. Unlike the MNLA, it did not seek independence but rather the imposition of Islamic law (Sharia) across Mali. The movement's leader Iyad Ag Ghaly was part of the early 1990s rebellion and has been reported to be linked to an offshoot of Al-Qaeda in the Islamic Maghreb (AQIM) that is led by his cousin Hamada Ag Hama as well as Algeria's Département du Renseignement et de la Sécurité (DRS).

Mali was going through several crises at once that favored the rise of the conflict:
 State crisis:  the establishment of a Tuareg state has been a long-term goal of the MNLA, since it began a rebellion in 1962. Thereafter, Mali has been in a constant struggle to maintain its territory.
 Food crisis: Mali's economy has an extreme dependence on outside assistance, which has led Economic Community of West African States (ECOWAS) to blockade, to subdue the military junta.
 Political crisis: The mutiny led to the fall of the president.

Tuareg rebellion (January–April 2012)

The first attacks of the rebellion took place in Ménaka, a small town in far eastern Mali, on 16 and 17 January 2012. On 17 January, attacks in Aguelhok and Tessalit were reported. The Mali government claimed to have regained control of all three towns the next day. On 24 January, the rebels retook Aguelhok after the Malian army ran out of ammunition. The next day the Mali government once again recaptured the city. Mali launched air and land counter operations to take back the seized territory, amid protests in Bamako and Kati. Malian president Amadou Toumani Touré then reorganised his senior commanders for the fight against the rebels.

On 1 February 2012, the MNLA took control of the city of Menaka when the Malian army operated what they called a tactical retreat. The violence in the north led to counter protests in the capital city of Bamako. Dozens of Malian soldiers were also killed in fighting in Aguelhok. On 6 February, rebel forces attacked Kidal, a regional capital.

On 4 March 2012, a new round of fighting was reported near the formerly rebel-held town of Tessalit. The next day, three Malian army units gave up trying to lift the siege. The United States Air Force air-dropped supplies via C-130 Hercules aircraft in support of the besieged Malian soldiers. The C-130's most likely came from either Ouagadougou, Burkina Faso, or Mauritania, both of which are known to have been used by the United States military. On 11 March, the MNLA re-took Tessalit and its airport, and the Malian military forces fled towards the border with Algeria.

The rebels advanced to about 125 kilometers away from Timbuktu and their advance was unchecked when they entered without fighting in the towns of Diré and Goundam. Ansar Dine stated that it had control of the Mali-Algeria border.

Coup d'état

On 21 March 2012, soldiers dissatisfied with the course of the conflict attacked Defense Minister Sadio Gassama as he arrived to speak to them. They then stoned the minister's car, forcing him to flee the camp. Later that day, soldiers stormed the presidential palace, forcing Touré into hiding.

The next morning, Captain Amadou Sanogo, the chairman of the new National Committee for the Restoration of Democracy and State (CNRDR), made a statement in which he announced that the junta had suspended Mali's constitution and taken control of the nation. The mutineers cited Touré's alleged poor handling of the insurgency and the lack of equipment for the Malian Army as their reasons for the rebellion. The CNRDR would serve as an interim regime until power could be returned to a new, democratically elected government.

The coup was "unanimously condemned" by the international community, including by the United Nations Security Council, the African Union, and the Economic Community of West African States (ECOWAS), the latter of which announced on 29 March that the CNRDR had 72 hours to relinquish control before landlocked Mali's borders would be closed by its neighbours, its assets would be frozen by the West African Economic and Monetary Union, and individuals in the CNRDR would receive freezes on their assets and travel bans. ECOWAS and the African Union also suspended Mali. The U.S., the World Bank, and the African Development Bank suspended development aid funds in support of ECOWAS and the AU's reactions to the coup.

Côte d'Ivoire President Alassane Ouattara, who was the rotational chairman of ECOWAS, said that once the civilian government was restored an ECOWAS stand-by force of 2,000 soldiers could intervene against the rebellion. Burkina Faso's President Blaise Compaore was appointed as a mediator by ECOWAS to resolve the crisis. An agreement was reached between the junta and ECOWAS negotiators on 6 April, in which both Sanogo and Touré would resign, sanctions would be lifted, the mutineers would be granted amnesty, and power would pass to National Assembly of Mali Speaker Dioncounda Traoré. Following Traoré's inauguration, he pledged to "wage a total and relentless war" on the Tuareg rebels unless they released their control of northern Malian cities.

Continued offensive
During the uncertainty following the coup, the rebels launched an offensive with the aim of capturing several towns and army camps abandoned by the Malian army. Though the offensive ostensibly included both the MNLA and Ansar Dine, according to Jeremy Keenan of the University of London's School of Oriental and African Studies, Ansar Dine's military contribution was slight: "What seems to happen is that when they move into a town, the MNLA take out the military base – not that there's much resistance – and Iyad [ag Aghaly] goes into town and puts up his flag and starts bossing everyone around about Sharia law."

On 30 March 2012, the rebels seized control of Kidal, the capital of Kidal Region, as well as Ansongo and Bourem in Gao Region. On 31 March, Gao fell to the rebels, and both MNLA and Ansar Dine flags appeared in the city. The following day, rebels attacked Timbuktu, the last major government-controlled city in the north; they captured it with little fighting. The speed and ease with which the rebels took control of the north was attributed in large part to the confusion created in the army's coup, leading Reuters to describe it as "a spectacular own-goal".

On 6 April 2012, stating that it had secured all of its desired territory, the MNLA declared independence from Mali. However, the declaration was rejected as invalid by the African Union and the European Union.

Islamist–nationalist conflict (June–November 2012)

After the withdrawal of Malian government forces from the region, former co-belligerents Ansar Dine, MOJWA, and the MNLA soon found themselves in conflict with each other as well as the populace.

On 5 April 2012, Islamists, possibly from AQIM or MOJWA, entered the Algerian consulate in Gao and took hostages. The MNLA succeeded in negotiating their release without violence, and one MNLA commander said that the movement had decided to disarm other armed groups. On 8 April, a mostly Arab militia calling itself the National Liberation Front of Azawad (FNLA) announced its intention to oppose Tuareg rule, battle the MNLA, and "return to peace and economic activity"; the group claimed to consist of 500 fighters.

The MNLA clashed with protesters in Gao on 14 May, reportedly injuring four and killing one. On 6 June, residents of Kidal protested against the imposition of Sharia in the town and in support of MNLA, protests which were violently dispersed by Ansar Dine members. By the night of 8 June, MNLA and Ansar Dine rebels clashed against each other in the city with automatic weapons, with two dying in the skirmish.

In early June, Nigerien president Mahamadou Issoufou stated that Afghan and Pakistani jihadists were training Touareg Islamist rebels.

Battle of Gao and aftermath

Clashes began to escalate between the MNLA and the Islamists after a merger attempt failed, despite the signing of a power-sharing treaty.

Protests broke out on 26 June 2012 in the city of Gao, the majority of whose people are not Tuaregs (as opposed to the MNLA), but rather sub-Saharan groups such as the Songhay and Fula peoples. The protestors opposed the Tuareg rebels and the partition of Mali. Two were killed as a result of the protests, allegedly by MNLA troops. The protesters used both Malian and Islamist flags, and France 24 reported that many locals supported the Islamists as a result of their opposition to the Tuareg nationalists and the secession of Azawad.

On 26 June 2012, the tension came to all-out combat in Gao between the MNLA and MOJWA, with both sides firing heavy weapons. MNLA Secretary General Bilal ag Acherif was wounded in the battle. The MNLA were soon driven from the city, and from Kidal and Timbuktu shortly after. However, the MNLA stated that it continued to maintain forces and control some rural areas in the region.

As of October 2012, the MNLA retained control of the city of Ménaka, with hundreds of people taking refuge in the city from the rule of the Islamists, and the city of Tinzawatene near the Algerian border. In the same month, a splinter group broke off from the MNLA; calling itself the Front for the Liberation of the Azawad (FPA), the group stated that Tuareg independence was no longer a realistic goal and that they must concentrate on fighting the Islamists.

Takeover of Douentza and Ménaka

On 1 September 2012, MOJWA took over the southern town of Douentza, which had previously been held by a Songhai secular militia, the Ganda Iso. A MOJWA spokesman said that the group had had an agreement with the Ganda Iso, but had decided to occupy the town when the militia appeared to be acting independently, and gained control of the town following a brief standoff with Ganda Iso. Once MOJWA troops surrounded the city, the militia reportedly surrendered without a fight and were disarmed.

On 16 November 2012, Tuareg MNLA forces launched an offensive against Gao in an attempt to retake the town. However, by the end of the day, the Tuaregs were beaten back by the MOJWA forces after the Islamists laid an ambush for them. A Malian security source said that at least a dozen MNLA fighters were killed while the Islamists suffered only one dead. An MNLA official stated that their forces killed 13 MOJWA fighters and wounded 17, while they suffered only nine wounded.

On 19 November 2012, MOJWA and AQIM forces took over the eastern town of Ménaka, which had previously been held by the MNLA, with dozens of fighters from both sides and civilians killed. On the first day of fighting, the MNLA claimed its forces killed 65 Islamist fighters, while they suffered only one dead and 13 wounded. The Islamists for their part stated they killed more than 100 MNLA fighters and captured 20.

Foreign intervention (January 2013)

Following requests from both the Mali government and ECOWAS for foreign military intervention, on 12 October 2012 the United Nations Security Council unanimously, under Chapter VII of the United Nations Charter, passed a French resolution approving an African-led force to assist the army of Mali in combating the Islamist militants. The resolution gave 45 days for "detailed and actionable recommendations" for military intervention which would be drafted by ECOWAS and the African Union, with a figure of 3,000 proposed troops reported. A prior ECOWAS plan had been rejected by diplomats as lacking sufficient detail.

While authorising the planning of force, and dedicating UN resources to this planning, UN Security Council Resolution 2071 does not authorize the deployment of force. However, UN Security Council Resolution 2085, passed on 20 December 2012, "authorizes the deployment of an African-led International Support Mission in Mali (AFISMA) for an initial period of one year."

On 8 January 2013, rebels were reported by Al Jazeera to have captured 12 Malian government troops near the town of Konna. On the same day, RFI reports that governmental troops fired warning shots and slightly progressed from Konna toward Douentza.

MNLA realigns with the Malian Government
By December, the now displaced MNLA began peace talks with the Malian government and relinquished its previous goal of Azawadi independence in favor of a request for self-rule within Mali. After the French entry in January 2013, the MNLA spokesman in Paris, Moussa Ag Assarid (who had criticized the splinter group FPA months earlier for giving up on independence) declared that the MNLA was "ready to help" their former opponents in the fight against the Islamists. At this time, the MNLA controlled no big localities and was only strong in rural and desert areas near the borders with Mauritania, Algeria and Niger, having been driven off from most of its claimed territory by Islamist groups.

After the declaration, the MNLA re-engaged the Islamist forces, and, with the help of one defecting Islamist faction, retook the cities of Tessalit and Kidal (the site of earlier pro-MNLA protests against the Islamists) in late January.

Battle of Konna and French intervention 

On 10 January 2013, Islamist forces captured the strategic town of Konna, located 600 km from the capital, from the Malian army. Later, an estimated 1,200 Islamist fighters advanced to within 20 kilometers of Mopti, a nearby Mali military garrison town.

The following day, the French military launched Opération Serval, intervening in the conflict. According to analysts, the French were forced to act sooner than planned because of the importance of Sévaré military airport, located 60 km south of Konna, for further operations. The operation included the use of Gazelle helicopters from the Special forces, which stopped an Islamist column advancing to Mopti, and the use of four Mirage 2000-D jets of the Armée de l'Air operating from a base in Chad. 12 targets were hit by the Mirages during the night between the 11th and the 12th. The French chief of army staff, Édouard Guillaud, announced that the Islamists had withdrawn from Konna and retreated several dozen of kilometres into the north. The air strikes reportedly destroyed half a dozen Islamist armed pick-up trucks and a rebel command center. One French pilot, Lieutenant Damien Boiteux, was killed after his attack helicopter was downed by ground fire during the operation.

During the night of 11 January 2013, the Malian army, backed by French troops, claimed it had regained control of the town of Konna, and claimed to have killed over 100 Islamists. Afterwards, a Malian lieutenant said that mopping up operations were taking place around Konna. AFP witnesses had seen dozens of Islamist corpses around Konna, with one saying he counted 46 bodies. The French stated four rebel vehicles were hit by their airstrikes, while the Malian Army claimed nearly 30 vehicles were bombed. Several dozens of Malian soldiers and 10 civilians were also killed. A resident of Gao, the headquarters of the MOJWA, said that the city's hospital had been overwhelmed with dead and wounded. In all, one local resident counted 148 bodies around Konna.

In the wake of the French deployment, ECOWAS said that it had ordered troops to be deployed immediately to Mali, the UN Security Council said that the previously planned UN-led force would be deployed in the near future, and the European Union said it had increased preparations for sending military training troops into Mali. The MNLA also offered to join the offensive against the Islamists.

On 12 January the British government announced that it was deploying two Royal Air Force C-17 transport planes in a non-combat role to ferry primarily French but also potentially African forces into Mali.

On 13 January, regional security sources announced the death in Konna of Abdel Krim nicknamed "Kojak", a high level leader in the Ansardine group. French defense minister Le Drian said that new airstrikes were ongoing in Mali, happened during the last night and will happen the next day as well. A resident of Léré told that airstrikes had been conducted in the area. The airstrikes were concentrated on three areas, Konna, Léré and Douentza. Two helicopters were seen attacking Islamist positions in Gao. A dozen strikes targeted the city and its outskirts. A resident reported that all Islamist bases around Gao had been taken out of operation by the strikes. An Islamist base in Kidal was targeted by the French air force. French defence minister Le Drian, announced that four Rafale fighters had participated in the Gao airstrikes. They left France and are now based in Chad.

It was reported that following the strikes which destroyed their bases, the MUJAO forces left Gao. Residents reported that 60 Islamists died in the Gao airstrikes. Some other were hiding in the houses and picked the dead bodies during the night.

On 14 January, the Islamists attacked the city of Diabaly 400 km north of Bamako, in the government-held areas. They came from the Mauritanian border where they fled to avoid the airstrikes. The AQIM leader known as Abu Zeid was leading the operation. On the same day, Islamists pledged to launch attacks on French soil. Jihadists took control of Diabaly a few hours after their attacks.

On 15 January, the French defense minister confirmed that the Mali military had still not recaptured Konna from rebel forces, despite earlier claims that they did. Meanwhile, the Royal Canadian Air Force dispatched a C-17 transport plane to Mali in a similar role as those of the British C-17s. The Danish Parliament decided to contribute a C-130 transport plane and the Belgian government made the decision to send two C-130s along with one Medical Component Agusta A109 Medevac medical evacuation helicopter along with 80 support personnel to Mali.

In Aménas hostage crisis 

On 16 January, it was reported that a group of AQIM militants had crossed the border from Mali into Algeria and had captured an Algerian/Statoil/BP-owned natural gas field, In Aménas, near the border with Libya. The militants were reported to have killed two foreign nationals and were holding 41 foreign nationals hostage, and a spokesman for the group said that the purpose of the attack was to get revenge on the countries that had intervened in Mali. The hostages reportedly included several American, Japanese, British, Romanian, Filipino and Norwegian citizens. Algeria was reportedly negotiating with the militants to try and obtain the hostages' release.
On 19 January 11 militants and 7 hostages were killed in a final assault to end the standoff. In addition, 16 foreign hostages were freed, including 2 Americans, 2 Germans, and 1 Portuguese.

Malian northward advance

On 16 January, French special forces, along with the Malian army, began fighting small and mobile groups of jihadists inside the city of Diabaly, but the French defense minister has denied the presence of French troops fighting in Diabaly.

On the same day, the government of Spain approved the dispatch of one transport aircraft to Mali for the purposes of logistical and training support. Meanwhile, the government of Germany authorized the contribution of two Transall C-160 transport aircraft to ferry African troops into the capital Bamako. Likewise, the government of Italy pledged air transport-based logistical support.

On 17 January, Banamba was put on alert after Islamists were reportedly spotted near the town. The Malian army immediately deployed 100 soldiers to the town, which were reinforced later. A convoy of Islamists reportedly left Diabaly and was heading towards Banamba on the same day, but no fighting ultimately took place in the town.

On 18 January, the Malian Army released a statement claiming to have complete control of Konna again. The claim was confirmed by residents of Konna as well as a spokesman for Ansar al-Dine. The same day, rebels were driven out of Diabaly according to multiple local sources.

Reports came out on 19 January that residents of Gao had lynched Aliou Toure, a prominent Islamist leader and the MOJWA police commissioner of the city, in retaliation for the killing of a local journalist, Kader Toure. AFP cited local reports saying that the Islamists were beginning to leave other areas under their control to seek refuge in the mountainous and difficult-to-access Kidal Region. On the same day, two Nigerian soldiers were killed and five were injured by Islamists near the Nigerian town of Okene as they were heading toward Mali.

On 20 January, the United States denied that they had attempted to bill the French for American support in the conflict. USAF C-17s began to fly in French troops and supplies the next day.

On 21 January French and Malian troops entered Diabaly without resistance. Douentza was also taken on the same day.

On the evening of 24 January Malian soldiers took control of Hombori. On the same day a splinter group of Ansar al-Dine, calling itself the Islamic Movement for Azawad (MIA), stated that it wanted to seek a peaceful solution to the conflict and urged France and Mali to cease hostilities in the north in order "to create a climate of peace which will pave the way for an inclusive political dialogue".

On 26 January, French Special Forces took over the airport and an important bridge in the city of Gao which remained largely Islamist-held. The troops reported "harassment" from Islamist forces but no solid resistance to their operations. The city was taken by a French-backed Malian force later that day.

A new split happened in Ansar Dine, with one of its commanders in Léré, Kamou Ag Meinly quitting the group and joining the MNLA.

On 27 January, French and Malian forces encircled Timbuktu and began securing the city. After gaining the airport on 27 January, the next day, Malian and French military sources claimed that the entire area between Gao and Timbuktu was under government control and access to the city was available. The city was fully taken by French and Malian forces by the next day.

On 28 January, the MNLA took control of Kidal with the help of the Islamic Movement of Azawad (MIA), an Ansar Dine breakaway group that split after the international intervention. The MNLA also took control of the towns of Tessalit and in Khalil. Apparently, fighters who deserted the MNLA for the better financed Ansar Dine were now returning to the MNLA. Islamists were reported to have fled to the mountains.

On 29 January, the first non-Malian African troops entered North Mali. Nigerien soldiers occupied Ansongo and Chadian troops, Ménaka. The more numerous Chadian Army was also reported as moving north from Ménaka in support of the Malian Army.

On 30 January, French reached Kidal airport. No Malian soldiers were with them, as a confrontation with Tuaregs was feared. The town was reportedly under control of fighters from both the MNLA and MIA. The MNLA, however denied any collaboration or even a desire to collaborate with the MIA, and stated that their fighters were maintaining control of the town alongside French forces. Many leaders of Ansar Dine left Iyad Ag Ghali. Delegations from the MNLA and MIA left for Ouagadougou to negotiate with Malian officials.

On 2 February, Chadian troops from MISMA reached Kidal and stationed in a deserted base in the city. Their general said that they had no problem with the MNLA and had good relations with them. On the same day, the French President, François Hollande, joined Mali's interim President, Dioncounda Traoré, in a public appearance in recently recaptured Timbuktu.

On 5 February, according to Chadian news stations, 24 Chadian soldiers were killed and 11 were wounded when they were ambushed by jihadists during a patrol north of Kidal. The information was neither denied nor confirmed by Chadian and Malian authorities. However, the Chadian government did mention that 11 soldiers were injured in a "traffic accident" north of Kidal.

On 8 February, French and Chadian troops announced that they had occupied Tessalit near the Algerian border, the seat of one of the last airports still not controlled by the Malian government and its allies.

Beginning of guerrilla phase

Islamist and Tuareg forces were reported to have retreated to the Adrar des Ifoghas, rugged badlands in northeastern Mali. Knowledge of and control over local sources of water is expected to play a vital role in continuing conflict in that area. On 19 February, France began a new operation (Panther) intended to subdue the region.

Between 8 and 10 February, MUJAO – who had been harassing government forces from the outskirts since Malian and French forces took the city on 26 January – launched the first two suicide attacks of the war in Gao, resulting in the death of the two bombers and injuring a Malian soldier and a civilian. Islamist fighters armed with AK-47s then crossed the Niger River on canoes, took over an abandoned police station and deployed snipers in nearby buildings in anticipation of the government forces' counterattack. The situation was controlled by pro-government forces after heavy fighting which included an air attack on the police station by French helicopters.

On 19 February, Islamists attacked a French parachute regiment of 150 soldiers supported by a heavy vehicle patrol and Mirage fighter jets. One French commando, a sergeant, was killed and so were 20 Islamist militants.

Gao was attacked a second time on 20 February. Islamists again crossed the Niger and came close to the city hall, possibly with help from locals. The same day, a car bomb exploded in Kidal, killing two people. The fighting in Gao subsided after five Islamists were killed by Malian soldiers.

On 22 February 2013, 13 Chadian soldiers and 65 Islamists were killed during heavy fighting in the northern mountains. The same day two suicide bombers crashed their cars into the MNLA's local operations center in the town of in Khalil, killing 5 people including 3 MNLA fighters and both bombers.

U. S. President Obama announced on 22 February 2013 that about 100 American troops had been sent to Niger, which borders Mali, to aid the French in Mali. The most recent U. S. troops were sent to help set up a new air base, from which to conduct surveillance against Al Qaeda. 40 U. S. Air Force logistics specialists, intelligence analysts and security officers arrived in the capital of Niger on 20 February 2013, bringing the total Americans deployed in Niger to 100.

On 24 February 28 Islamists and ten Chadian soldiers were killed while fighting in the Adrar des Ifoghas mountains in Northern Mali.

On 26 February, a car bomb exploded in Kidal targeting a MNLA checkpoint. At least 7 MNLA fighters along with the suicide bomber were killed in the attack.

On 20 March, AQIM claimed to have executed a French hostage in Mali, Phillipe Verdon, who had been kidnapped in 2011.

On 23 March, Islamist fighters from MUJAO attacked the city of Gao, causing heavy fighting for two hours. The Malian army eventually repulsed this attack.

On 30 March, a suicide bomber detonated his explosives near a Malian army checkpoint in Timbuktu, allowing a group of jihadists to infiltrate by night. By 1 April, with the help of a French army detachment supported by war jets, the Malian army pushed the jihadists out of the city center.

On 29 April, a French paratrooper was killed by a roadside bomb in Northern Mali, the sixth French soldier to die in the conflict. Two others were seriously injured.

On 28 February, Algerian television informed that Abdelhamid Abou Zeid, one of the three top men of AQIM and deemed responsible of several kidnappings of westerners in the Sahel in the 2000s, had been killed in battle against Franco-Chadian forces in the Tigharghar mountains along with about 40 of his followers, some kilometres away from Aguelhok. The information was neither confirmed nor denied by the French Army.

On 2 March 2013, it was reported that Mokhtar Belmokhtar, mastermind of the In Amenas hostage crisis in which 800 hostages had been taken and 39 Westerners killed at an Algerian oil refinery, had been killed as well.  Chadian state television announced that "Chadian forces in Mali completely destroyed the main jihadist base in the Adrar de Ifhogas mountains... killing several terrorists including leader Mokhtar Belmokhtar", according to a BBC report.  BBC correspondent Thomas Fessy said this would be a major blow if confirmed.

On 4 March 2013, Al Qaeda's North African branch confirmed the death of Abou Zeid, but denied that Belmokhtar had been killed.

U.N. Peacekeeping Force
Now that the bulk of the conflict is over and the need for extended military involvement is decreasing, France looks to the UN to take over with the peacekeeping force that had been suggested earlier in the conflict once it was a more stable situation. The operation was termed MINUSMA.

On 3 December 2020, the UK government announced an increase in the British Army commitment to MINUSMA, with 300 soldiers principally drawn from the Light Dragoons and the Royal Anglian Regiment operating with 'a highly specialised reconnaissance capability'.

Chadian withdrawal
On 14 April, Chadian president Idriss Déby Itno announced the full withdrawal of Chadian Forces in Mali (FATIM), saying that face-to-face fighting with Islamists is over, and the Chadian army does not have the skills to fight a guerilla-style war. This announcement comes days after a suicide bomber killed four Chadian soldiers in Kidal, where 1,800 of its soldiers are currently stationed.

Peace deal
A peace deal between the government and Tuareg rebels was signed on 18 June 2013.

Insurgency and Operation Barkhane

The MNLA ended the ceasefire in September of the same year after government forces opened fire on unarmed protesters. Following the attack, MNLA vice-president Mahamadou Djeri Maiga remarked: "What happened is a declaration of war. We will deliver this war. Wherever we find the Malian army we will launch the assault against them. It will be automatic. The warnings are over." One of the MNLA's founders, Attaye Ag Mohamed, was also quoted as saying that the "political and military wings of the Azawad" had declared "the lifting of the ceasefire with the central government".

2014–2015: Insurgents regroup, Islamic State taking part 

On 20 February, Germany and France announced the shipment of elements of the Franco-German brigade to Mali to help train Mali troops. This is the first deployment of EU troops in Africa (as an EU contingent).

2016–2017: Conflict spreading to neighboring countries, creation of JNIM

2018–2020: Conflict intensifies and French troops surge 
In the first half of 2018, there was an increase in rebel attacks. As of July 2018, northern Mali was largely out of government control. In July 2018, three British RAF Chinook helicopters were deployed to assist with logistics and troop movement, to reduce the risks of ground transportation.

On 13 February 2020, Mali government forces returned to Kidal after six years.

On 6 April, militants attacked a military base in the Gao town of Bamba, killing at least 25 Malian soldiers. From 24 April–27 August, a series of attacks took place in Mopti Region.

2021–present: French withdrawal and Russian intervention 
In the first days of January 2022, after several months of rumors and negotiations, several hundred Russian mercenaries from the Wagner Group were deployed in Mali, as well as soldiers from the Russian regular army in charge of logistics or serving as instructors. This deployment leads to strong protests from France, the United States and the Coordination of Movements of Azawad. Mali is also asking for a revision of its defense agreements with France. For its part, ECOWAS adopted heavy sanctions on January 9 against the Malian junta. On February 17, France, the European countries involved in Task Force Takuba and Canada officially announced their decision to withdraw their forces from Mali. French President Emmanuel Macron declared on this occasion: "We cannot remain militarily engaged alongside de facto authorities whose strategy or hidden objectives we share neither".

Russian mercenaries signaled themselves through exactions: on the night of March 1 to 2, at least 35 Fulani civilians were massacred by the Malian army and the Wagner Group 1388.

On March 4, the Mondoro military camp was attacked by jihadists and at least 27 Malian soldiers were killed.

For its part, the Islamic State in the Greater Sahara attacked on March 8 and 9 the localities of Tamalat and Insinane, near Ménaka, held by the MSA. The clashes left a hundred dead, including several dozen Tuareg civilians massacred by the jihadists.

On August 15, 2022, French troops had fully withdrawn from Mali towards Niger, ending their presence in the country.

On October 31, 2022, a decision was made to withdraw the contingent of Russian private military campaigns from the Republic of Mali.

Casualties

2012
2012 fatalities – 133.

2013
2013 fatalities 9+:
September Timbuktu bombing – 2 civilians and 4 bombers killed.
23 October – civilians and 2 peacekeepers killed.

2014
On 17 January, a Chadian MINUSMA peacekeeper was killed in an attack on a French-UN camp in Kidal.
On 11 June, a car bomb killed four Chadian peacekeepers in Aguelhok.
On 18 September, five Chadian MINUSMA peacekeepers were killed by a land mine. The Chadian government described the incident as "discriminatory" and said its soldiers were being used as "shields". On 23 October, two Chadian peacekeepers were killed in an attack in Tessalit.

2017
On 5 May 2017, a rocket hit a MINUMSA base killing a Liberian soldier and injuring 7 other soldiers, including several Liberians and a Swedish soldier.

On 18 June, Jama'at Nasr al-Islam wal Muslimin Islamists attacked a luxury resort in Bamako killing 5 people, including one Portuguese soldier. 6 attackers were also killed in the shooting and hostage-taking.

On 26 July 2017, 2 German pilots died in a helicopter-crash.

2019
In a surge of attacks during October–November, over 100 Mali soldiers were killed. The attacks increased political discontent towards the government from the military community. The attacks also increased discontent towards the French peacekeeping forces located in the central part of the country. In response to the attacks, the military abandoned isolated outposts in the north.

2020
In February 2020, HRW documented atrocities against civilians in Central Mali and said that at least 456 civilians were killed, while hundreds were injured from January 2019 until November. The rights organization also cited that it interviewed 147 victims, ethnic communities and security and justice officials.

On April 6, 2020, an attack on a military camp in Mali left at least 23 dead, while several others injured. The Malian News Agency reported that the incident was carried out by unidentified gunmen, who took away the military equipment and also burned the camp. In July 2020, the France 24 reported that unidentified gunmen opened fire on civilians on multiple villages of Mali and killed at least 31 civilians and 9 soldiers who returned fire, all within a week's time.

To date over 600,000 have been displaced by this conflict.

2021
On March 17, at least 33 soldiers are killed and 14 others are wounded in an attack on a military post in Gao, Mali.

On July 4, four Malian soldiers were killed in an ambush on their patrol near the town of Léré. No group claimed responsibility for the attack, which came as France resumed joint military exercises with members of the Malian Armed Forces, which had been suspended following the coup d'état that year led by Colonel Assimi Goïta.

On 31 December 2021, Mali's army announced 8 soldiers had died and 7 had been wounded during an attack in Sahel on the previous day (30 December 2021). They also said 31 assailants were also killed but did not identify the group.

2022

On 22 January 2022, a French soldier was killed and nine were injured in a mortar attack on Barkhane military camp in Gao, northern Mali.

In March 2022, government forces set siege to the town of Mourrah. According to Human Rights Watch, over 300 civilians died.

Human rights concerns

Following several reports of abuse from both sides, the prosecutor of the International Criminal Court opened a case investigating war crimes in Mali on 16 January 2013. This case is the quickest any ICC investigation has begun after foreign military intervention.

Claims against separatists and Islamists
In May 2012, Amnesty International released a report stating that the conflict had created Mali's worst human rights situation since 1960. The organization stated that fighters with the MNLA and Ansar Dine were "running riot" in Mali's north, and documented instances of gang rape, extrajudicial executions, and the use of child soldiers by both Tuareg and Islamist groups.

On 3 April 2012, armed groups looted 2,354 tons of food from United Nations' World Food Programme's warehouses in Kidal, Gao and Timbuktu, causing the WFP to suspend its food distribution operations in northern Mali. Other targets of looting included hospitals, hotels, government offices, Oxfam offices and the offices and warehouses of other unnamed aid groups. The WFP also stated that 200,000 had so far fled the fighting, predicting that the number would rise.

Claims against Islamists

Ansar el Dine also blocked a humanitarian convoy bringing medical and food aid from reaching Timbuktu on 15 May, objecting to the presence of women in the welcoming committee set up by city residents; after negotiations, the convoy was released on the following day. The group reportedly banned video games, Malian and Western music, bars, and football in Gao and ransacked alcohol-serving establishments in both Gao and Kidal. Islamist forces were also reported to have intervened against looters and ordered women to wear head scarves. The CNRDR's spokesman Amadou Konare claimed that "women and girls have been kidnapped and raped by the new occupants who are laying down their own law." The anti-slavery organization Temedt claims that ex-slaves were the first targeted for punishment by Islamist forces and that former masters have used the violence to recapture ex-slaves.

On 29 July 2012, a couple was stoned to death by Islamists in Aguelhok for having children outside of marriage. An official reported that many people left the town for Algeria following the incident. On 9 August, Islamist militants chopped off the hand of an alleged thief in the town of Ansongo, despite a crowd pleading with the militants for mercy.

Destruction of ancient monuments in Timbuktu
During the conflict, Islamists also damaged or destroyed a number of historical sites on the grounds that they said were idolatrous, particularly in Timbuktu, a UNESCO World Heritage Site. On 4 May 2012, Ansar Dine members reportedly burned the tomb of a Sufi saint. In late June, Islamists attacked several more sites in Timbuktu with pickaxes and shovels.

On 28 January 2013, as French-led Malian troops captured the airport of the World Heritage town of Timbuktu, the Ahmed Baba Institute, host of priceless ancient manuscripts, was razed by fleeing Islamists.

Claims against the Malian Army and loyalists
The Tuaregs and Arabs who lived in Bamako and elsewhere in southern Mali were subjects of a rash of ethnic attacks by black Malians (as opposed to Mediterranean Arabs and racially mixed Tuaregs), despite many of them being hostile to Azawad separatism as well as the Islamists. In fact, a large part of them actually had only recently arrived to the government-held south, fleeing the violence in the north.

An incident arose on 8 September 2012 when a group of Malian soldiers detained 17 unarmed Tablighi preachers from Mauritania in Dogofry, north-east of Diabaly, while en route to a religious conference in Bamako and executed all but one of them without reporting to their own command. The Malian government expressed its condolences for the event, which Associated Press considered a symptom of the disintegration of discipline and command in the Malian Army as a result of the 21 March Coup.

On 19 January 2013, Human Rights Watch report killings and other human rights abuses committed by the Malian army in the central Malian town of Niono. Tuaregs and Arabs were especially targeted.

On 23 January 2013, BBC reported claims by the International Federation of Human Rights that Malian Army soldiers had carried out summary executions against people suspected of being militant, and with bodies subsequently being hastily buried in makeshift graves and wells. Some victims were reportedly killed for not having identity documents or for their ethnicity. Reportedly, dozens of ethnic Tuaregs living in Bamako had their homes raided by government troops.

In popular culture
Mali earned the first win in the 2013 Africa Cup of Nations football championship on 20 January 2013 with a 1–0 win over Niger. After scoring the only goal, Seydou Keita displayed a T-shirt with a peace sign on it. A number of musicians from Mali came together to record the song Mali-ko (meaning peace) and release a video titled Voices United for Mali-'Mali-ko' in early 2013 about the ongoing conflict in the country. The collaboration includes many well-known Malian musicians, including Oumou Sangaré, Vieux Farka Touré, and Amadou & Mariam.

Ceasefire
A ceasefire was agreed upon on 20 February 2015 between the Malian government and the northern rebels. The terms of the truce state that both sides agreed to "tackle the causes of lasting tensions in the region" as the AFP news agency puts it.

The BBC mentioned that "Mali's leaders have rejected autonomy, but are willing to consider devolved local powers."

Notes

References

Bibliography

Further reading
 Alexis Arieff, "Crisis in Mali," Congressional Research Service Report for Congress, 14 January 2013
 Possibilities and Challenges for Transitional Justice In Mali ICTJ
 MINUSMA super camp attack

External links

 Orphans of the Sahara, a three-part documentary series about the Tuareg people of the Sahara desert.

 
2010s in Mali
2020s in Mali
2010s conflicts
2020s conflicts
Conflicts in 2012
Conflicts in 2013
Conflicts in 2014
Conflicts in 2015
Conflicts in 2016
Conflicts in 2017
Conflicts in 2018
Conflicts in 2019
Conflicts in 2020
Conflicts in 2021
Conflicts in 2022
Conflicts in Mali
Rebellions in Mali
History of Azawad
Tuareg rebellions
Arab Winter in Mali
Civil wars involving the states and peoples of Africa
Coup-based civil wars
Ethnicity-based civil wars
Religion-based civil wars
Separatist rebellion-based civil wars
Wars involving France
Wars involving Mali
Wars involving the states and peoples of Africa
Africa–China relations
Chinese aid to Africa
Wars involving the People's Republic of China